Linda Joyce Greenhouse (born January 9, 1947) is an American legal journalist who is the Knight Distinguished Journalist in Residence and Joseph M. Goldstein Lecturer in Law at Yale Law School. She is a Pulitzer Prize-winning reporter who covered the United States Supreme Court for nearly three decades for The New York Times. Since 2017, she is the president of the American Philosophical Society, and a member of the Phi Beta Kappa Senate.

Early life and education
Greenhouse was born in a Jewish family in New York City, to H. Robert Greenhouse, a physician and professor of psychiatry at Harvard Medical School, and Dorothy (née Greenlick). She received her Bachelor of Arts degree in government from Radcliffe College in 1968, where she was elected to Phi Beta Kappa. She received her Master of Studies in Law from Yale Law School in 1978, during which time she was a student of Robert Bork.

Career
Greenhouse began her 40-year career at The New York Times covering state government in the paper's bureau in Albany. After completing her master's degree on a Ford Foundation fellowship, she returned to the Times and covered 29 sessions of the Supreme Court from 1978 to 2007, with the exception of two years during the mid-1980s during which she covered Congress. Since 1981, she has published over 2,800 articles in the Times. She has been a regular guest on the PBS program Washington Week.

In 2008, Greenhouse accepted an offer from The New York Times for an early retirement at the end of the Supreme Court session in the summer of 2008. Seven of the nine sitting Justices attended a goodbye party for Greenhouse on June 12, 2008.

In 2010, Greenhouse and co-author Reva Siegel put out a book on the development of the abortion debate prior to the 1973 Supreme Court ruling on the subject: Before Roe v. Wade. This was largely a selection of primary documents, though with some commentary.

From 2010 to 2021, Greenhouse wrote a biweekly opinion column for The New York Times, centered on the Supreme Court.

Greenhouse criticized US policies and actions at Guantanamo Bay, Abu Ghraib, and Haditha in a 2006 speech at Harvard University. In it, Greenhouse said she started crying a few years back at a Simon & Garfunkel concert because her generation hadn't done a better job of running the country than previous generations.

Awards and prizes
Greenhouse was awarded the Pulitzer Prize in Journalism (Beat Reporting) in 1998 "for her consistently illuminating coverage of the United States Supreme Court."  In 2004, she received the Goldsmith Career Award for Excellence in Journalism and the John Chancellor Award for Excellence in Journalism. She was a Radcliffe Institute Medal winner in 2006.

When she was at Radcliffe, she said in a speech given in 2006, "I was the Harvard stringer for the Boston Herald, which regularly printed, and paid me for, my accounts of student unrest and other newsworthy events at Harvard. But when it came time during my senior year to look for a job in journalism, the Herald would not even give me an interview, and neither would the Boston Globe, because these newspapers had no interest in hiring women."

Criticism
Greenhouse has expressed her personal views as an outspoken advocate for abortion and critic of conservative religious values, and a 2006 report on NPR questioned whether this compromised the appearance that she maintains journalistic neutrality on such matters. New York Times public editor Daniel Okrent said that he has never received a single complaint of bias in Greenhouse's coverage.

Conflict of interest
Ed Whelan, writing in a blog associated with National Review, suggested that Greenhouse had an obligation to her readers to inform them when she reported on a Supreme Court case for which her husband, Eugene Fidell, had submitted an amicus brief, such as in the Hamdan case and the Boumediene case. Clark Hoyt, the public editor of the New York Times, opined that the paper "should have clued in readers" to Greenhouse's conflict, but defended the neutrality of her coverage. Emily Bazelon and Dahlia Lithwick, writing in Slate, complained that the New York Times "had failed to stand up" for Greenhouse and defended Greenhouse from Whelan's criticism. They quoted Yale Law School professor Judith Resnik who pointed out that Whelan had been unable to point to any actual sign of bias.

Personal life 
She married lawyer Eugene R. Fidell on January 1, 1981, in Washington, D.C., in a Jewish ceremony. Together they have one daughter, filmmaker Hannah Fidell (born October 7, 1985).

Works

References

External links

 
 
 
 
 
 Video clip of June 2006 Harvard speech
 

20th-century American journalists
21st-century American journalists
American women journalists
Jewish American journalists
The New York Times writers
Pulitzer Prize for Beat Reporting winners
American women legal scholars
American legal scholars
Yale Law School faculty
American abortion-rights activists
American women's rights activists
Activists from New York (state)
Journalists from New York City
Radcliffe College alumni
Yale Law School alumni
1947 births
Living people
20th-century American women
American women academics
21st-century American women
21st-century American Jews
Presidents of the American Philosophical Society